Heidi Hauge (born 14 October 1967) is a Norwegian singer of folk and country music. 

She began her career as a schlager singer. In 1999 she was noted by a manager of the Norwegian label Showtime Records, thereby signing her first contract. The following year she published her debut album, Country Time.

In 2001 her third album, Country Girl, reached the 15th place in the Norwegian album charts. Her best standing was the 7th place in 2004, with the same album. Six of her albums also entered the Danish charts, four of them in the top ten.

By the end of 2002, with four published albums, Heidi Hauge had sold 170,000 records in Norway and 25,000 in Denmark, where she had appeared in a TV 2 program to promote her music. 

The majority of her songs are covers of country music classics, most of them in English but also in the Norwegian language.

Discography

Albums 
 2000 – Country Time
 2001 – Country Rose
 2001 – Country Girl
 2002 – Country Blue
 2002 – Country Dance
 2003 – Country perler
 2003 – Country jul (with Liv Marit Wedvik and Jenny Jenssen)
 2004 – Country Jewels
 2005 – Country Gold
 2005 – Movin' On
 2007 – Some Broken Hearts...
 2007 – Julekveld på landet
 2016 – Acoustic Country Duets (with Arne Benoni)
 2019 – Best of Heidi Hauge

Singles 
 2000 – "Seven Spanish Angels"
 2007 – "Saturday Night"
 2014 – "I Can't Be Bothered Now" (with Arne Benoni)

References

Norwegian country singers
Norwegian folk singers
Musicians from Skien
1967 births
Living people